Michael Terrence Gabbett is an Australian clinical geneticist and academic. He is an Associate Professor at both Queensland University of Technology and Griffith University. Gabbett is known for contributing to discovering the genetic basis of semi-identical (sesquizygotic) twins and defining the clinical features and molecular cause of Temple-Baraitser syndrome.

Early life
Gabbett attended high school at Marist College Ashgrove, where he was awarded the Australian Student Prize and was accepted into the University of Queensland to study medicine.

Service to professional organisations
For three years (2015-2018), Gabbett was chair of the scientific programme and the local organising committees (Lead Fellow) for RACP Congress, the annual scientific meeting of the Royal Australasian College of Physicians'. Gabbett has served as president of the Australasian Association of Clinical Geneticists (2017-2019). From 2018 to 2022, Gabbett sat on Council of the Human Genetics Society of Australasia as Treasurer.

References

People from Brisbane
1974 births
Brisbane
Brisbane
Fellows of the Royal Australasian College of Physicians
Geneticists
Australian geneticists
Medical researchers
Medical geneticists
Human geneticists
Academics from Brisbane
Australian medical doctors
Australian clinical geneticists
Australian paediatricians
Medical doctors from Brisbane
Medical doctors from Queensland
21st-century Australian medical doctors
Academic staff of Queensland University of Technology
University of Queensland Mayne Medical School alumni
University of Queensland alumni
University of Newcastle School of Medicine alumni
University of New South Wales Medical School alumni
Living people